"Movin'" is a song written by Randy Muller and Wade Williamston, and performed by R&B/disco band Brass Construction.

Background
The song was culled together from a 16-minute jam session by the band.

Chart performance
Released from their self-titled 1976 album, the single spent a week at number one on the R&B singles chart in the spring of that year.  It was also successful on the pop charts, peaking at number 14 on the Billboard Hot 100.  On the disco dance charts, "Movin'" went to number one for four weeks and spent a total of twelve weeks on the chart.  Outside the US, "Movin'" went to number 23 in the UK in 1976 and peaked at number 24 as "Movin' 1988" when remixed by PWL's Phil Harding.

Samples
"Got Myself Together" by Kenny "Dope" Gonzalez sampled the song for The Bucketheads' album All in the Mind.
Pumps and a Bump by MC Hammer.

Popular Culture
The song is heard playing in the background in the Good Times episode "The Big Move", Part One, at the Evanses' going-away party, where they receive the news that the Evanses' patriarch, James, had been killed in an automobile accident.

References

1976 debut singles
Disco songs